Postia duplicata is a species of poroid fungus in the family Fomitopsidaceae that was described as a new species in 2014. It is found in Yunnan and Zhejiang provinces of China, where it causes a brown rot on angiosperm wood. The fungus is named (duplicata) for its characteristic two-layered context, a feature that distinguishes it from other Postia species. The spores made by this fungus are cylindrical, hyaline, smooth, and typically measure 3.8–5.8 by 1.8–2.5 µm.

References

Fomitopsidaceae
Fungi of China
Fungi described in 2014
Taxa named by Bao-Kai Cui
Taxa named by Yu-Cheng Dai